Rub out may refer to:

 Assassination
 Buffing
 Cancel (disambiguation)
 The Delete character in ASCII (usually written as one word, "rubout")
 Erasing
 Homicide
 Massage
 Masturbation